Muswellbrook is a town in the Upper Hunter Region of New South Wales, Australia, about  north of Sydney and  north-west of Newcastle.

Geologically, Muswellbrook is situated in the northern parts of the Sydney basin, bordering the New England region.

The area is predominantly known for coal mining and horse breeding, but has also developed a reputation for gourmet food and wine production. As at June 2018 Muswellbrook has a population of 12,364. Located to the south of the Muswellbrook township are two coal fuelled power stations, Liddell and Bayswater. They were commissioned in 1973 and mid 1980s respectively and employ approximately 500 people from the area.

History
Before European settlement of the region the Wonnarua and Gamilaroi peoples occupied the land. The first European to explore the area was Chief Constable John Howe in 1819, with the first white settlement occurring in the 1820s. The township of Muswellbrook was gazetted on 23 October 1833. To the south, "Forbestown" was established by the sons of Francis Forbes in 1842; the name was changed in 1848 to "South Muswellbrook" to prevent confusion with the town of Forbes.

Heritage listings 
Muswellbrook has a number of heritage-listed sites, including:
 7 Bridge Street: Muswellbrook Post Office
132 Bridge Street: Weidmann Cottage
 142-144 Bridge Street: Loxton House
 178, 180-188 Bridge Street: Eatons Group
 710 Denman Road: Edinglassie
 Denman Road: Rous Lench
 Hunter Terrace: St Alban's Anglican Church
 Main Northern railway: Muswellbrook railway station

Etymology
"Mussel Creek" (now called "Muscle Creek") was first named by a party of surveyors who found mussels in the small stream while camping along its banks in the early 19th century. The present spelling of Muswellbrook has a disputed etymology. Historians largely subscribe to one of two theories:
 that the name derives from the Muswell Hill area of London (England), due to the influence of Sir Francis Forbes whose wife, Amelia, was born and schooled in that town; or
 that the name is a gradual corruption of the original gazetted name "Musclebrook", eventually adopted as the official spelling due to common use.

Population
According to the 2016 census of Population, there were 12,075 people in Muswellbrook.
 Aboriginal and Torres Strait Islander people made up 9.3% of the population. 
 84.9% of people were born in Australia. The most common countries of birth were New Zealand 1.4%, England 1.2% and Philippines 0.9%.   
 87.7% of people only spoke English at home. 
 The most common responses for religion were Anglican 27.8%, Catholic 24.5% and No Religion 23.5%.

Transport
The New England Highway currently passes through the town. A route was selected for a bypass in 2006 but the Australian Government suspended the project in August 2008. Denman Road provides a connection to the Golden Highway.

Rail  
The Muswellbrook railway station, is serviced by local (Newcastle to Scone) and long-distance rail (Sydney to Armidale and Moree) services. Interstate coaches and local bus services also call at the station.

Muswellbrook lies at the junction of the Main Northern railway line and the Merriwa line, part of a cross country rail line to Gulgong. As such, it formed an important junction, as well as serving the numerous coal mining sidings found within a short distance from the main station building.

Popular culture
The Steely Dan song "Black Friday" from the 1975 album Katy Lied contains the lyrics: 
"When Black Friday comes,
I'll fly down to Muswellbrook,
gonna strike all the big red words
from my little black book.

Gonna do just what I please,
gonna wear no socks and shoes,
with nothing to do but feed
all the kangaroos."

Songwriter Donald Fagen explained the lyrics in an interview with Paul Cashmere of Undercover Music; "I think we had a map and put our finger down at the place that we thought would be the furthest away from New York or wherever we were at the time".

Donald Horne spent his early childhood in Muswellbrook and the first volume of his autobiography, The Education of Young Donald, features an extensive description of life in the town in the 1920s and early 1930s. 

Muswellbrook is also mentioned in Thomas Keneally's book The Chant of Jimmie Blacksmith.

Annual events
 Blue Heeler Film Festival
 Muswellbrook Carnivale
 Muswellbrook and Upper Hunter Eisteddfod
 Muswellbrook Creative Arts Fair
 NAIDOC Week Art Awards
 Noisy Heerler Music Festival (October)
 St Heliers Heavy Horse Field Days

Schools
 Muswellbrook South Public School
 Muswellbrook Public School
 St James Muswellbrook
 Muswellbrook High School
 Muswellbrook Pre School Kindergarten
 Pacific Brook Christian School
Little Kindy Muswellbrook

Military history
During World War II, Muswellbrook was the location of RAAF No.5 Inland Aircraft Fuel Depot (IAFD), completed in 1942 and closed on 29 August 1944. Usually consisting of 4 tanks, 31 fuel depots were built across Australia for the storage and supply of aircraft fuel for the RAAF and the US Army Air Forces at a total cost of £900,000 (A$1,800,000).

Notable persons
 Kurt Barnes (born 1981), a professional golfer, was born and raised in Muswellbrook
 Brooke Boney (born 1987), entertainment reporter on the Nine Network's breakfast program Today
 James Clifford (1936–1987), an artist, was born and raised in Muswellbrook
 Tommy Emmanuel  (born 1955), a virtuoso guitarist, was born in Muswellbrook
 Jamie Feeney (born 1978), a rugby league footballer was born in Muswellbrook
 Wayne Harris (born 1960), a jockey who rode Jeune to victory in the 1994 Melbourne Cup, was born and raised in Muswellbrook
 Shayne Hayne (born 1967), a rugby league football referee, grew up and spent most of his life in Muswellbrook
 Donald Horne  (1921–2005), an author and journalist, was raised in Muswellbrook. Much of one of Horne's memoirs, The education of young Donald, published in 1967, was based on his educative years in Muswellbook
 Simon Orchard (born 1986), an Australian hockey player and Olympic medalist, was born and raised in Muswellbrook
Brydie Parker (born 1999),a rugby league footballer for the Sydney Roosters NRLW side, was born in Muswellbrook.
Fletcher Baker (born 1999),a rugby league footballer for the Sydney Roosters NRL side, was born in Muswellbrook.

See also

 Hunter Institute of TAFE
 Hunter River (New South Wales)
 Power FM 98.1
 The Muswellbrook Chronicle and Upper Hunter advertiser
 Wollemi National Park

References

External links

 Muswellbrook Shire Council
 Google Maps satellite image of Muswellbrook
 Walkabout guide Muswellbrook

Suburbs of Muswellbrook Shire
Towns in the Hunter Region
 
Hunter River (New South Wales)